A pixie is a small humanoid creature in British folklore. Pixie, pixies, or pixy may also refer to:

Art, entertainment, and media

Books
 Pixy, a graphic novel by the Swedish cartoonist Max Andersson
 Pixie (comics), several comic book characters

Film and television
 Pixies (film), a 2015 animated film
 Pixie (film), a 2020 Irish comedy thriller film
 Pixie, one of the main characters of the animated television series Pixie and Dixie and Mr. Jinks
 The Pixies (The Fairly OddParents), a large group of fairy-like entities in the animated television series The Fairly OddParents
 "Pixies", an episode of the television series Mona the Vampire

Music
 Pixies (band), American alternative rock band (1986–1993, 2004–present)
Pixies (EP)
 Pixy (group), South Korean girl group formed in 2021.

Computing and technology
 Pixie (CMS), content management system
 Pixie (renderer), photorealistic renderer
 Pixie, a magnifying glass application included in Apple Developer Tools 
 Palm Pixi, a smartphone developed by Palm

Confections
 Pixies, a popular Fannie May confection consisting of caramel and pecans coated in milk chocolate
 Pixy Stix, a sugary candy in straw-like packaging

Other uses
 Pixie (name), list of people with the name
 Pixie, a type of upper-atmospheric lightning
 Pixie cut, short layered women's hairstyle with a shaggy fringe
 Pixies, the common name for butterflies in the genus Melanis
 Pixie mandarin, a cultivar of Citrus reticulata

See also
Pixel
PXE (disambiguation)
Pyx
Pixey, English indie pop musician
Particle-induced X-ray emission (PIXE), a technique for analyzing the composition of materials